Anthony Lewis Granato (born July 25, 1964) is an American former professional ice hockey left winger and former head coach of the Wisconsin Badgers men's ice hockey team. He served as head coach of the United States men's national ice hockey team at the 2018 Winter Olympics. Previously, he also served as head coach of the National Hockey League (NHL)'s Colorado Avalanche, as well as with the Detroit Red Wings and Pittsburgh Penguins as an assistant coach.

Playing career

New York Rangers
Following high school, Granato was drafted by the New York Rangers in the sixth round, 120th overall, in the 1982 NHL Entry Draft. After a college career at the University of Wisconsin–Madison, Granato made an immediate impact in his first season with the Rangers in 1988–89, leading the team in goals scored (36), which still stands as the team record for goals by a rookie. In what Rangers at the time called "the biggest [deal] in club history", Granato was traded with teammate Tomas Sandström to the Los Angeles Kings on January 20, 1990, in exchange for center Bernie Nicholls.

Los Angeles Kings
Granato continued to be a prolific goal scorer with the Kings and was a key player in their run to the 1993 Stanley Cup Finals, contributing 17 points over the course of the playoffs. During a February 9, 1994, game in Los Angeles, Granato, after receiving a hard hit from the Chicago Blackhawks' Neil Wilkinson, retaliated by hitting Wilkinson in the head with a two-handed slash. Granato was subsequently suspended by the NHL for 15 games. As of 2012, this was the seventh-longest suspension in NHL history. On January 25, 1996, Granato suffered a serious head injury in a game against the Hartford Whalers that resulted in a bleeding on the left lobe of his brain. He underwent surgery and although there was speculation he would not play again, he returned to the ice in the 1996–97 NHL season after being traded to the San Jose Sharks.

San Jose Sharks
Granato returned to the ice in the 1996–97 NHL season with San Jose. Due to concerns of further brain injury, Granato wore a specially padded helmet as a precautionary measure. He had a productive first season in San Jose registering 25 goals and 15 assists in 76 games. In 1997, Granato received the Bill Masterton Memorial Trophy. However, his productivity steadily declined, with only 59 collective points in his remaining four seasons with the Sharks. He retired as a player after the 2001 season.

Coaching career
Granato joined the Colorado Avalanche as an assistant coach prior to the 2002–03 NHL season. After a sub-par start to the season, the Avalanche fired head coach Bob Hartley on December 18, 2002, and Granato was subsequently promoted to replace him. Following the slow start under Hartley, the Avalanche went 32–11–4–4 under Granato and captured their ninth consecutive division title (including one title as the Quebec Nordiques). However, they lost in the first round of the 2003 Stanley Cup playoffs to the Minnesota Wild in seven games after a 3–1 series lead. In his first full season behind the bench, Granato led Colorado to a 40–22–20 record, finishing second in their division. During the 2004 Stanley Cup playoffs, the Avalanche defeated the Dallas Stars in five games in the quarter-finals, but lost to the  Sharks in six games in the semi-finals.

After the disappointing playoff loss to the Sharks, Granato was replaced by Joel Quenneville. Granato was reassigned and agreed to stay on as an assistant, holding that position for three seasons. On May 22, 2008, Granato was renamed head coach of the Avalanche after the departure of Quenneville for the 2008–09 NHL season. The Avalanche posted a record of 32–45–5, the worst since the team moved from Quebec in 1995, and Granato was fired on June 5, 2009.

On August 5, 2009, Granato joined the coaching staff of the Pittsburgh Penguins, signing on as an assistant coach. Granato guided the Penguin's defense (2.49 goals against per game, tenth) and penalty killing (85.0 percent, fifth) to top-ten league finishes during the 2013–14 NHL season.

On June 25, 2014, it was announced the Penguins would not retain their coaching staff for the 2014–15 season.

On July 15, 2014, Granato was hired as an assistant coach for the Detroit Red Wings.

On March 30, 2016, Granato was named the head coach at his alma mater, the University of Wisconsin–Madison.

On August 4, 2017, Granato was announced as the head coach for the United States national team during the 2018 Winter Olympics. His team eventually placed seventh.

On March 6, 2023, University of Wisconsin Director of Athletics Chris McIntosh announced that Granato would not return for the 2023-24 season.

College Coaching Record

Personal life
Granato is the older brother of Hall of Fame hockey player Cammi Granato, and is the brother-in-law of former NHL player Ray Ferraro. Tony and his wife, Linda, are the parents of four children. Tony still has a lot of personal connections to his hometown, Downers Grove. Siblings Don, Rob, and Cammi were influenced by the Chicago Blackhawks and the 1980 Winter Olympics USA gold medal.

Awards and achievements

Career statistics

Regular season and playoffs

International

Coaching record

See also
List of NHL head coaches

References

External links

Player profile at hockeydraftcentral.com

1964 births
Living people
American ice hockey coaches
American men's ice hockey left wingers
American people of Italian descent
Bill Masterton Memorial Trophy winners
Colorado Avalanche coaches
Colorado Rangers players
Detroit Red Wings coaches
Ice hockey coaches from Illinois
Ice hockey players from Illinois
Ice hockey players at the 1988 Winter Olympics
Los Angeles Kings players
National Hockey League All-Stars
National Hockey League assistant coaches
New York Rangers draft picks
New York Rangers players
Olympic ice hockey players of the United States
People from Downers Grove, Illinois
Pittsburgh Penguins coaches
San Jose Sharks players
United States men's national ice hockey team coaches
Wisconsin Badgers men's ice hockey players
Ice hockey coaches at the 2018 Winter Olympics
AHCA Division I men's ice hockey All-Americans